The César Award for Best Animated Film is awarded annually by the Académie des Arts et Techniques du Cinéma since 2011.

Winners and nominees

2010s

2020s

Multiple wins/nominations

Wins
Benjamin Renner-2

Nominations
Benjamin Renner-3
Michel Ocelot-2

See also
César Award for Best Animated Short Film
Academy Award for Best Animated Feature
Academy Award for Best Animated Short Film
BAFTA Award for Best Animated Film
European Film Award for Best Animated Feature Film

References

External links 
  
 César Award for Best Animated Film at AlloCiné

Film Animated
Awards for best animated feature film
Awards established in 2011
2011 establishments in France